La Petite Grocery is a neighborhood eatery located in Uptown New Orleans, Louisiana. Open since 2004, the restaurant features south Louisiana French-inspired cuisine. The restaurant's executive chef is Justin Devillier, and is owned by New Orleans restaurateur Joel Dondis.

La Petite Grocery's name originates from Frank Vonderhaar's 1937 market called “the little grocery store.” When La Petite Grocery opened in 2004, it paid homage to the Vonderhaar family with its restaurant name.

In 2007, Food & Wine Magazine noted La Petite Grocery as “A neighborhood spot you could revisit every week…we loved: bouillabaisse of gulf seafood.”

References

External links
 lapetitegrocery.com

Restaurants established in 2004
Restaurants in New Orleans
2004 establishments in Louisiana